Big Brother 2010, also known as Big Brother 11, was the eleventh series of the British reality television series Big Brother, and the final series of the show to be broadcast by Channel 4. The show followed twenty-one contestants, known as housemates, who were isolated from the outside world for an extended period of time in a custom built House. Each week, one or more of the housemates were evicted by a public vote. The last remaining housemate, Josie Gibson, was declared the winner, winning a cash prize of £100,000 and a place as a Housemate on Ultimate Big Brother, an All Star edition of Big Brother which began immediately after the conclusion of Big Brother 2010

It launched on 9 June 2010 and ended on 24 August 2010, lasting 77 days - the shortest run since the fifth series in 2004. Davina McCall returned as presenter for the eleventh and final time. Fourteen housemates entered on launch night, with seven additional housemate being introduced in later weeks. The series was watched by an average of 3 million viewers.

Following Channel 4's decision in 2009 not to renew their contract with Endemol to show the series, Channel 5 bought the rights to Big Brother in the United Kingdom, where it was broadcast from 18 August 2011, Big Brother was axed again on 5 November 2018.

Production

Auditions
Open auditions for the series took place in Manchester on 15–16 January 2010, in Dublin on 19 January 2010, in Cardiff on 23 January 2010, in Glasgow on 30 January 2010 and in London on 6–7 February 2010.

Pre-series
On 10 May, the Celebrity Big Brother 7 website was replaced with a Big Brother 11 mini-site updated with 23 pictures of Big Brother 11s new trailer. The trailer was aired on Channel 4 during The Million Pound Drop Live on 24 May. The trailer featured 30 ex-housemates from the past 10 series of Big Brother attending a funeral of the Diary Room Chair, with show narrator Marcus Bentley as the priest.

On 14 May, it was announced on the Big Brother mini-site that Emma Willis would be joining the current presenter of Big Brother's Little Brother, George Lamb, as co-host for the series. On 17 May, break bumpers featuring the falling flowers began showing on Channel 4. To celebrate the final series of Big Brother, Davina McCall hosted a special programme, Big Brother's Big Awards Show, where the British public has bestowed accolades upon memorable housemates from the previous series. This special was aired on E4 on 22 May. A further programme, Big Brother Exposed: The Inside Story, was aired on 28 May on E4, brought viewers highlights of the past ten series. On 21 May, Channel 4 unveiled the floral-themed eye logo for this summer's series of Big Brother.

Eye logo
The logo, which was made up of hundreds of brightly coloured flowers, and was a tribute to the eleven series since its debut in 2000.

Title Sequence
The titles had a carnival theme which included spinning cogs, a gramophone which was exploding with flower petals, a ventriloquist dummy and a spinning Big Brother clock which was striking 11. There was also cutaway messages during the titles, spelling out 'Welcome' 'To The' 'Mad House'.

Format
The theme for this series was carnival. Like always, housemates entered the House with no contact with the outside world. Each week, the housemates took part in a compulsory task that determined the amount of money they were allocated to spend on their shopping; if they passed, they received a luxury budget and they were allocated a basic budget if they failed. Housemates nominated two housemates for eviction every week. In a new nominations twist revealed on Day 6, the nominated housemates were allowed to escape nominations with a weekly Save and Replace challenge. The Save and Replace winner is exempt from nominations, however, they must replace themselves with another housemate of their choice for eviction. This nominations twist that was held every week is similar to the Power of Veto from the American version of Big Brother.

Eviction format
The eviction format saw a number of changes, at the beginning of an eviction show, a round-up of the weeks events - featuring newspaper headlines - would be shown to viewers. This series saw the return of McCall announcing the eviction from outside the house with the housemates hearing the live audience cheering, booing and chanting. Occasionally, If more than two housemates faced eviction, McCall would announce which nominee(s) will be safe, however, this was only done a handful of times (Week 1, 2 and 7), three housemates face eviction in Weeks 3, 5 and 8, and four in Week 9, where no announcement of who was safe was announced, in Week 10 eight housemates faced the public vote which would lead to the first ever quadruple eviction, out of the four times McCall spoke to the house she would announce one nominee who was safe and then announce the evictee who would have to leave immediately. The eviction announcements were made in no particular order (see Nominations Table), John James received the highest number of eviction votes, followed by Corin, Sam and Steve, however the order they left the house was Steve, Corin, Sam and John James.

Another change to the eviction format was the housemates 'best bits getting shown before the interview rather than at the end as in every other series - although the previous Celebrity series adopted this format. The panel format used in the eviction interviews the previous year did not return, instead McCall interviewed the evictee in a one-on-one format, however, for the first time ever, viewers could call in with questions to ask the evictee. Also, evictees were shown goodbye messages the housemates recorded for them in the event of their departure, similar to the format used in the American version of the show. The new eviction format continued for Ultimate Big Brother, the only difference that all interviews were performed outside of the studio.

Special features

Tree of Temptation
Located in the bathroom was a chest of drawers created from the Tree of Temptation that was present in the 2010 celebrity series. The Tree of Temptation gave housemates secret tasks to gain rewards for themselves or other housemates. The first task occurred on Day 1 when Mario was performing his "Impossible Task". This is the list of all tasks throughout the series:

Bob Righter
Bob Righter is a fortune teller machine that provided the housemates with (often cryptic) information on upcoming tasks and events. It is so named as it is an anagram of "Big Brother".

The House
The first aerial pictures of the House were released by the Daily Star magazine as early as mid-May. On 5 June, pictures of the interior of the House were released. Rooms revealed were the entrance, living room, kitchen, bedroom, bathroom, and the garden.

The final Big Brother House was the most luxurious and open. The House was mainly walled with floral designs on glass, similar to series 7. The entrance had a theme of heaven, but had been revamped to one staircase rather than the previous two staircases. The diary room was tucked on the right hand side. Upon entering the living room, there was one large red sofa with a red/black theme. In contrast to the kitchen and bathroom's modern effect, the bedroom consisted of a Salvador Dalí design in the beds. The garden kept up a carnival theme, including a carousel. A snug was also built for the housemates to lounge and chat, and in addition, a mini pool/hot tub. On Day 70, the house was evacuated to a temporary location due to severe flooding in the living area and bedroom. The housemates returned later, and were limited to the task room to live.

Housemates

On Day 1, eighty-one hopefuls arrived at the entrance of the House – seventy-nine of whom had been revealed before the series began. Only fourteen housemates were selected to enter out of all candidates. The first thirteen were selected by Big Brother, and the fourteenth housemate (Mario) was selected by a random draw. Three new housemates (Andrew, Keeley and Rachel), whose identities were revealed on the Channel 4 website on Day 30, arrived in the House by spaceship during the Day 31 eviction show. On Day 45, three more new housemates (JJ, Jo and Laura) were selected to enter the House by the current housemates from a choice of six. These six were among those not chosen to enter the House on Day 1. After Laura walked, Sam, who was one of the three not selected on Day 45, entered the House on Day 52 as part of the "Ignore the Obvious" task.

Weekly summary

House flood
On the evening of Day 70 the house suffered from a freak rainstorm, resulting in the evacuation of the housemates to a nearby location in the Big Brother compound, due to severe flooding which caused leaks in the bedroom and living room from the roof. After several hours, the housemates returned to the house. For the remainder of Day 70 and the majority of Day 71, housemates only had access to the large task room (in the form of a makeshift bedroom), the garden, the garden toilet and small task room located off of this (formerly the mole hole, acting as a replacement small task room for the one located off the diary room) and the nest (in the form of a makeshift diary room). To prevent conversations in the nest ("diary room") with Big Brother from being overheard by other housemates, when a housemate wished to use the nest ("diary room"), the others had to move to the large task room ("bedroom").

At 8:33pm on Day 71, the housemates were allowed access to the whole house.

On Big Brother's Little Brother on Day 71, George Lamb interviewed the creative director of Big Brother, Phil Edgar-Jones. George asked what caused the leak, and Phil replied "Some of the housemates were throwing socks up onto the roof, the socks got stuck in the gutter and because of that the water couldn't drain, so it collected on the roof."Phil also highlighted the extent of the flooding by showing that approximately six inches of water had accumulated in the housemates' beds.

Nominations table

Notes

: As new housemates, Andrew, Keeley and Rachel could not nominate and could not be nominated by their fellow housemates. During that week, they also could not be replaced in the Save and Replace task.
: As punishment for discussing nominations, Caoimhe was banned from nominating and Keeley's nominations were voided. Caoimhe later walked from the house, meaning Corin, Keeley and Rachel were up for eviction. Had this not happened then Caoimhe and Rachel would have been up for eviction. The Save and Replace task was abandoned due to Keeley being injured during the task. Keeley was taken to hospital on Day 42 and Week 6's eviction was cancelled shortly after. On Day 45 Keeley decided to recuperate further at home and not return to the House.
: As new housemates, JJ, Jo and Laura could not nominate and could not be nominated by their fellow housemates. During that week, they also could not be replaced in the Save and Replace task. As punishment for discussing nominations, Dave was banned from nominating and automatically faced eviction, along with the two or more housemates who received the most nominations.
: As a new housemate, Sam could not nominate and could not be nominated by his fellow housemates. During that week, he also could not be replaced in the Save and Replace task.
: As punishment for talking about nominating Sam, Dave, John James, and Josie were banned from nominating him that week. However, they could have still replaced themselves with Sam if they had been nominated and won the Save and Replace task. Housemates nominated face-to-face in "Nasty Nominations" in the garden, in which housemates had to pour horrible substances over the two housemates they chose to nominate. As punishment for discussing nominations, Dave could not participate in the Save and Replace task.
: On Day 66, housemates had one minute to decide together whom to give a ticket to the final. They chose Josie, therefore saving her from eviction. The rest of the housemates faced eviction. Had nominations taken place, Sam would have been banned from nominating for discussing nominations. That week, the four housemates with the most votes were evicted in no particular order.
: For the final four days, the public were voting for who they wanted to win, rather than evict.

Ratings
These viewing figures are taken from BARB and include Channel 4 +1.

References

External links
 Official website
 

2010 British television seasons
11